Multiple satellite imaging is the process of using multiple satellites to gather more information than a single satellite so that a better estimate of the desired source is possible. So something that cannot be seen with one telescope might be visible with two or more telescopes.

Background
Interferometry is the process of combining waves in such a way that they constructively interfere. When two or more independent sources detect a signal at the same given frequency those signals can be combined and the result is better than each one individually. An overview of Astronomical interferometers and a History of astronomical interferometry can be referenced from their respective pages.

The NASA Origins Program was created in the 1990s to ultimately search for the origin of the universe. The theory that the Origins Program is based on is: since light travels at a constant speed until it is absorbed by something; there is still light that was part of the first light ever created traveling about the universe and ultimately some of that light is coming in the general direction of Earth. So a satellite system capable of collecting light from the beginning of the universe would be able to tell us more about where we came from.

There is also the constant search for life in other worlds. A satellite system using the interferometric technologies mentioned above would be able to have a much higher resolution than any of the current deep space imaging systems. A space systems also reduces the amount of interference due to lack of an atmosphere.

Future

NASA is currently focused on the Vision for Space Exploration and has reduced current funding for scientific unmanned space exploration in favor of human exploration. These budget cuts have slowed the multiple satellite imaging development and relevant scientific missions as Project Prometheus and Terrestrial Planet Finder have ended as well but research continues.

References
 Blair, Bill and Humberto Calvani.  "Far Ultraviolet Spectroscopic Analyzer".  14 January 2008. Johns Hopkins University.  23 January 2008.  .
 Chakrovorty, Suman. Multi-Spacecraft Interferometric Imaging Systems: The Search for New Worlds. Doctoral Dissertation. University of Michigan. 2003.
 Chambers, Lin H.. "Electromagnetic Spectrum." My NASA Data. 6 November 2007. National Aeronautics and Space Administration. 21 November 2008 .
 Chung, Soon-Jo, Miller, David W., and de Weck, Olivier L., "ARGOS testbed: study of multidisciplinary challenges of future spaceborne interferometric arrays," Optical Engineering, vol. 43, no.9, September 2004, pp. 2156–2167. (download PDF file)
 Duffieux, P.M.  The Fourier Transform and its Applications to Optics.  2nd edition.  New York:  John Wiley and Sons, Inc., 1983.
 Gano, S.E. and et al. “A Baseline Study of Low-Cost, High-Resolution, Imaging System using Wavefront Reconstruction.” A Collection of Technical Papers: AIAA Space 2001 Conference and Exposition, 28 – 30 August 2001, Albuquerque:  Aug 2001.
 Gatelli, Fabio, et al. "The Wavenumber Shift in SAR Interferometry." IEEE Transactions on Geoscience and Remote Sensing 32.4 (1994): 855,856–865.
 Hussein, Islam I., D. J. Scheeres and D.C. hyland.  Interferometric Observatories in Earth Orbit.  Published by American Institute of Aeronautics and Astronautics.  Danvers: 3 October 2003.
 Hussein, Islam I. Motion Planning for Multi-Spacecraft Interferometric Imaging Systems.  Doctoral Dissertation. University of Michigan. 2005.
 Hussein, Islam I., Scheeres, Daniel J., Bloch, Anthony M.,  Hyland, David C., McClamroch, N. Harris. Optimal Motion Planning for Dual-Spacecraft Interferometry. IEEE Transactions on Aerospace and Electronic Systems Vol. 43,  No. 2. Published: Apr 2007.
 Jackson, Randal. "Getting the Big Picture: Multiple telescopes, one target”.  Planet Quest.  National Aeronautics and Space Administration.  23 October 2007.  .
 Jackson, Randal. "How to take snapshots of distant worlds."  Planet Quest.  National Aeronautics and Space Administration.  23 October 2007.  .
 Jackson, Randal. "An instrument for ground-based planet searches".  Planet Quest.  National Aeronautics and Space Administration.  Sep 2007. .
 Jackson, Randal. "Keck Interferometer".  Planet Quest.  National Aeronautics and Space Administration.  Space.com.  Sep 2007.  .
 John M. Brayer, PhD "Introduction to Fourier Transforms for Image Processing".  University of New Mexico, Albuquerque.  Aug 2007 .
 Joseph W. Goodman. Introduction to Fourier Optics. 3rd Edition.  Greenwood Village:  Ben Roberts, 2005.
 Knight, Andrew. Basics of Matlab and Beyond.  Boca Raton:  Chapman & Hall, 2000.
 Lori Tyahla. "Introduction – Overview”.  The Hubble Space Telescope.  1 November 2006.  National Aeronautics and Space Administration. 1 November 2007. .
 Lavoie, Sue.  "Spacecraft and Telescopes."  Photo Journal.  National Aeronautics and Space Administration.  Sep 2007.  .
 Overcast, Marshall C. and Paul W. Nugent.  Computing the 2-D Discrete Fourier Transform or Sweet-talking MATLAB into Making Cool Pictures.
 Owens, Robyn. "Fourier Transform Theory."  29 October 1997.  12 October 2007.  .
 "Point spread function." 28 August 2007. Wikipedia. 7 July 2007.  Point spread function.
 Rarogiewicz, Lu. "Interferometry 101: How light is combined from multiple telescopes." 5 July 2001.  12 September 2007.  .
 Rodenburg, John M. "The Fourier Transform of a one-dimensional aperture (a harbour entrance)".  21 October 2004. .
 "Spitzer Space Telescope" Spitzer Science Center. California Institute of Technology. Sep 2007 .
 Steel, William Howard. Interferometry. New York:  Cambridge University Press, 1983.
 Steve Unwin. "Origins."  Origins Project.  National Aeronautics and Space Administration.  Sep 2007.  .
 Steward, E.G.  Fourier Optics: An Introduction.  2nd Edition.  Chichester:  Ellis Horwood Limited Publishers, 1987.
 Tracy Vogel. "Hubble Essentials."  Hubble Site.  National Aeronautics and Space Administration.  Sep 2007.  .
 Watanabe, Susan.  "Jet Propulsion Laboratory: California Institute of Technology".  National Aeronautics and Space Administration.  Sep 2007  .
 Weaver, H. Joseph.  Theory of Discrete and Continuous Fourier Analysis.  New York:  John Wiley and Sons, Inc., 1989.
 Williams, Charles Sumner and Orville A. Becklund. Introduction to the Optical Transfer Function.  New York:  Wiley, 1989.
 Yang, Xiangyang, and Yu, Francis, T. S. Introduction to Optical Engineering. New York: Cambridge University Press, 1997.

Image processing
Interferometers
Interferometry
Space telescopes
Satellite imagery